The La Galissonnière-class cruisers''' were commissioned by the French Navy in the 1930s. They are considered fast, reliable and successful light cruisers. With the cruiser , they joined the Allied forces after the successful Allied landings in North Africa in November 1942. The three other cruisers of the La Galissonière class, held under Vichy control at Toulon, were scuttled on 27 November 1942.

After refitting, Georges Leygues, Montcalm and Gloire took part in various Allied operations, including the Normandy landings in 1944. Postwar, several of the class acted as the flagship of the French Mediterranean Squadron, and carried out operations off Indo-China until 1954, and afterwards were deployed during the Suez Crisis and operations off Algeria. They were scrapped between 1958 and 1970.

Background

The French Navy emerged from World War I with light cruisers, in very small numbers, aged and exhausted by war service. One Austrian and four German light cruisers, were received as reparations for war losses. They were retired from active service by the early 1930s.

Funds were granted in the 1922 budget for the three s, known as 8000 tons cruisers, which were launched in 1923–24. They had four turrets mounting two guns each. The  guns, in regular use by the French Army were chosen to facilitate a streamlined ammunition supply chain.

Also remaining in service were armoured cruisers, built between 1900 and 1910, that were obsolete when they had been commissioned.

 Washington Naval Treaty 

As war experience had clearly shown the importance of securing trade routes against surface threats, all the signatories of the treaty had built, until 1930, nearly only Washington heavy cruisers (fifteen each for the United Kingdom and the United States, twelve for Japan, seven each for France and Italy).

In 1929, an improved unit, with a more powerful cruising diesel engine installation, and a more extended armoured belt, with nearly the same displacement (6,710 tons).

The British Navy considered that the Washington cruiser type was too large for its needs, and, in 1927, a slightly smaller -gun cruiser was laid down, HMS York, with only six 8-inch guns. As the 1930 London Naval Conference had just opened, the United Kingdom announced the cancellation of the next projected 8-inch-gun cruiser design, while the first unit of a new class was to be built, with a displacement of 6,500 tons and armed with eight  guns, able to counter Leipzig. It was HMS Leander.

 London Naval Treaty 

It fixed the limit for the number of Type A units of each signatory  to the number of existing cruisers, and authorized their replacement only twenty years after their completion.

In 1926, as France had started to produce classes of destroyers (and es) which were superior in displacement and firepower to the destroyers of that period, in order to counter this, Italy decided to produce a new class of cruiser that would be of intermediate size between the new French destroyer classes and the cruisers built in that period. The four units of the Da Giussano class (first sub-class of the  cruisers group) were laid down in 1928, and completed in 1931–32, respecting the newly signed London Naval Treaty.
   
A new French cruiser had been ordered in 1926 and launched in 1930, specially designed as a school ship for midshipmen. The cruiser  had the same 6.1-inch guns, in double turrets, as the Duguay-Trouin class. But when, after the London Naval Treaty, a new cruiser  was designed to operate both as a minelayer and as a destroyer flotilla leader, she was armed with a completely new armament and turret layout, nine  guns in three triple turrets, for the first time in the French Navy.

The triple turret was unusual in the French Navy, which had preferred the double turret on its battleships, and on its previous cruisers, or the quadruple turret. In 1910, the Chief Naval Constructor, French Navy, had designed the s with three quadruple turrets, and the quadruple turret was broadly used, on the s, as the mounting for the main armament, and for the dual-purpose secondary battery. On cruisers, the triple turret was used in all the U.S. Navy  Washington heavy cruiser classes, on the Reichsmarine light cruisers, and on  "pocket battleships".
 
This was on the basis of Émile Bertins armament, and on s  protection and propulsion that was designed the lead ship of the La Galissonnière class, launched in November 1933.

 Large light cruiser 

The Imperial Japanese Navy, and its Pacific Ocean rival the U.S. Navy, were both interested in large cruisers, whether they were classed "heavy" or "light". The first units of this class were launched in 1937–38. They were launched between 1934 and 1936. In reaction to the building of the Japanese and U.S. large light cruisers, the United Kingdom canceled some projected units of the Leander and Arethusa classes.

Three vessels, De Grasse, Guichen and Chateaurenault, were authorized shortly before the war as improved La Galissonnière class, with a displacement of 8,000 tons, the same armament and arrangement of three triple 152 mm turrets, two fore and one aft, and three twin AA 90 mm aft, one axial and two lateral. Aircraft installations, two catapults, crane and hangar, accommodating three/four seaplanes, would have been fitted in the ship's center, aft of a single large funnel. They were intended to have more powerful propulsion machinery, to reach . The silhouette, with a massive fore tower, would have been inspired by Algeries. But only the name ship was actually laid down in the Lorient Navy Yard, and as work was suspended during the war, she was launched in 1946, and completed only in 1956, as an integral anti-aircraft cruiser design.

 
With a displacement of 7,500 tons, and nine 152 mm guns, the La Galissonière-class cruisers belong to a middle category, comparable with the last Kriegsmarine light cruiser  (an improved version of Leipzig), the Italian cruiser  (from the intermediate version of the Condottieri class), or the nine-gun units of the s, reduced version of the Town-class cruisers.

The displacement of French cruisers was around 7,000–9,000 tons, yet it was enough to accommodate both heavy armour and heavy armament, while maintaining good maximum speed.

 Armament 

The class' main armament, in three triple mountings, concentrated a powerful broadside in a relatively small vessel. Their displacement was of the 7,000-ton class, just like the Italian Condottieri III Group (Attendolo and Raimondo Montecuccoli). While the Condottieris had four turrets with eight 152 mm guns, French cruisers had only three turrets with nine guns. The use of triple turrets allowed, as on the U.S. Navy cruisers, the deployment of nine 203 mm guns, or even fifteen 152 mm guns, on hulls of 10,000 tons, or on the German light cruisers, to have nine  guns, with less than 7,000 tons displacement.

The armament consisted of the 152 mm gun (152 mm/55 Model 1930), the only French-built gun of this caliber. The cruiser mount was the Model 1930, that displaced 169.3 tons (172 mt). The rate of fire was one shell every 12 seconds (5 rounds per min).

The secondary armament consisted of the 90 mm/50 cal Model 1926. It was a decided improvement over the old 75 mm guns, being mounted single or twin. La Galissonnière cruisers had four twin mounts. These ships were also fitted with two twin torpedo tubes, on sides, amidship. The torpedoes were the  23 DT model, in service since 1925. Their aircraft installations, with hangar and derrick on stern, and a catapult fitted on the top of the aft 152 mm turret, could accommodate four Loire 130 seaplanes.

Like most French warships completed prewar, they were originally weak in light anti-aircraft artillery, with four twin 37 mm guns, and six 13.2 mm twin mount machine guns. Four more were added in 1941, with one 37 mm and one double 25 mm guns, and two Hotschkiss 13.2 mm twin mount machine guns. The three ex-Vichy units received a refit, with American help, in 1943.

 Protection 

The armour was thicker than that of many other cruisers of the time (such as the Italian Condottieri class), heavy enough to withstand opposing cruiser main batteries. The belt and deck armour was substantially thicker than usual. This was enough to withstand a 152 mm round at combat range (navweaps.com gives 76 mm at 11,000 m, when fired from a British gun), while Italian counterparts cannot have done the same with their light armour, sacrificed for the best speed. Only the last group of Condottieri class was superior, with a heavier displacement of 9,100 tons (20% more than French cruisers), ten guns, and up to  armour (thought to withstand 152 mm as well), but they were only two ships. In any event, these powerful ships never fought one another. The La Galissonière-class cruisers 105 mm armored belt was also thicker than Nürnbergs , the Dido class's , or the Crown Colony class's armour, and equivalent to the Leanders.

 Propulsion 

Thus,  steamed an average of  during an 8-hour trial and  during a ninth hour. At the end of the war, they could still easily make , on a full load displacement then increased to 10,850 tons.

Service

The ships were:
 La Galissonnière: scuttled at Toulon
 Montcalm: scrapped 1970.
 Georges Leygues: scrapped November 1959
 : scuttled at Toulon
 Marseillaise: scuttled at Toulon
 Gloire: sold for scrap January 1958.

When completed, La Galissonnière, Jean de Vienne, and Marseillaise formed the 3rd Cruisers Division, flagship Marseillaise, attached to the Mediterranean Squadron, and based in Bizerte, Georges Leygues, Montcalm, and Gloire formed the 4th Cruisers Division, flagship Georges Leygues, attached to the Atlantic Fleet, and based in Brest. The 4th Cruiser Division carried out an endurance cruise to Indochina, from December 1937 to April 1938, and represented France at the July 1939 New York World's Fair.

 Phoney War and under Vichy control 

This squadron took part in screening Atlantic convoys, and tried unsuccessfully to give chase to German surface raiders. As Italy remained neutral in the Mediterranean, Marseillaise and Jean de Vienne took part in the shipping to Canada of a part of the Banque de France's gold reserve, in December 1939, and shipped troops in the Mediterranean in March 1940.

In April 1940, Émile Bertin was damaged by the Luftwaffe off Norway, and Montcalm replaced her, and took part in the evacuation of Namsos. In response to the increasingly threatening attitude of Italy, in April 1940, the Force de Raid was sent to the Mediterranean Sea, and the 3rd and 4th Cruiser Divisions were then based in Algiers. After Italy entered the war in June, they carried out two sorties, unsuccessfully attempting to intercept Italian fleet units.

On 3 July 1940, Admiral Sommerville's Force H was sent to Mers-el-Kébir. As the French Admiralty signalled in a radio message in clear, that the Algiers cruisers had been ordered to rejoin the battleship squadron off Mers-el-Kébir, the British Admiralty warned Admiral Somerville and hurried him to put an end to the negotiations with Admiral Gensoul and to open fire. So the six cruisers had only one thing to do, to steer for Toulon, where they arrived the day after.

Two months after, the Vichy authorities obtained permission from the German Armistice Commission to send the 4th Cruisers Division (George Leygues, Montcalm and Gloire), and three large destroyers, to Libreville, to counter the Free French Forces which had taken control of French Equatorial Africa territories, except Gabon. As the oiler Tarn, escorted by the French cruiser  had been intercepted in the Bight of Benin by British warships, and bound to Casablanca, refueling was no longer possible in Libreville, and the French cruiser squadron had to turn back to Dakar. Slowed by machinery problems, Gloire was intercepted by British cruisers, and was only allowed to proceed on to Casablanca, as Georges Leygues and Montcalm reached Dakar at full speed, and so took part in its defence against Operation Menace. Until 1943, they remained there, where Gloire joined them in March 1941: from 15–25 September 1942, she was sent to rescue the victims of the sinking of the British troopship Laconia, torpedoed by the German submarine .

In Toulon, two of the three cruisers from the 3rd Cruisers Division, Marseillaise and La Galissonnière, the latter being replaced on 15 March 1941 by Jean de Vienne, were incorporated in a so-called High Seas Force, which nearly never went to sea, due to the lack of fuel, but in November 1940, to cover the return to Toulon of the battleship , which had been severely damaged by British gunfire in July 1940. In January 1942, Jean de Vienne was sent to rescue the liner Lamoriciere, whose sinking in a winter tempest, off the Balearic Islands, caused more than 300 deaths.

After the successful Allied landings in Morocco and Algeria, in November 1942, the Germans occupied the Zone libre, and tried to seize the French warships in Toulon, (Operation Lila). But the three La Galissonière-class cruisers, La Galissonnière, Jean de Vienne, Marseillaise, as most of the ships based at Toulon, were scuttled, on 27 November 1942. In 1943, the Italian Navy tried to salvage Jean de Vienne and La Galissonnière, and registered them as FR11 and FR12. In 1944, after the Italian surrender, the Germans rendered the wrecks to the Vichy authorities, but they were sunk, following Allied bombing attacks on Jean de Vienne on 24 November 1943 and La Galissonnière, on 18 April 1944. They were both scrapped post war.

 Allied service 

Like all the French warships stationed in Africa and the French Antilles, Georges Leygues, Montcalm and Gloire joined the Allied Forces. Operating from Dakar, beginning in February 1943, Georges Leygues carried out  patrols in the Central Atlantic. On 13 April, she intercepted the German blockade runner Portland, as the Flag Officer, French Navy West Africa, was Admiral Collinet, formerly commanding officer of the battleship Strasbourg, at Mers-el-Kebir.

In February 1943, Montcalm was sent to Philadelphia, to be refitted with American help, remaining there until August 1943. Gloire was sent to Brooklyn, from July to November 1943, and Georges Leygues, to Philadelphia, from July to October 1943. Their aircraft mounts were removed and they were fitted with modernised anti-aircraft weapons. Sent to the Mediterranean Sea, the Montcalm supported the Liberation of Corsica in September 1943, and Gloire carried out bombardment missions against land-based targets in the Gulf of Gaeta in early 1944.Georges Leygues and Montcalm supported the Allied Normandy landings, and, together with Gloire, Operation Dragoon. Georges Leygues returned to Toulon, on 13 September 1944, bearing the flag of the Chef d'état-major de la Marine, Vice Admiral Lemonnier, her commanding officer when she had left Toulon, and at the Battle of Dakar in 1940. Until April 1945, the three cruisers were part of the so-called Flank Force, operating off the Mediterranean coast of the western Italian Riviera.

 Post war 

In 1945, they carried out various missions to Indochina, and after 1954, off the Algerian coast. Gloire was flagship of the French Mediterranean Squadron, in 1951–52, Montcalm from October 1952 to June 1954, and Georges Leygues afterwards, and she took part as flagship of the Intervention Force in the operations off Egypt, during the Suez Crisis, carrying out a bombardment mission against Rafah on 1 November 1956, and supporting the landing at Port-Saïd. Gloire and Georges Leygues were scrapped in 1958 and 1959, and Montcalm'' in 1970.

References

Bibliography

Further reading

External links

 152 mm gun
 90 mm gun
 torpedoes 

 
Ship classes of the French Navy